McGillivray is a surname. Notable people with the surname include:

 Alexander McGillivray, also known as Hoboi-Hili-Miko (1750–1793), leader of the Creek Indians during and after the American Revolution and principal chief of the Upper Creek (Muscogee) towns
 Alexander McGillivray (politician), Canadian lawyer and politician from Alberta, Canada
 Andy McGillivray (born 1954), Australian rules footballer
 Angus McGillivray (1842–??), Canadian lawyer and political figure from Nova Scotia, Canada
 C. R. McGillivray, or Calvin Ray McGillivray, American football coach 
 Charlie McGillivray, Scottish footballer and manager
 David McGillivray (producer/screenwriter) (born 1947)
 David McGillivray (figure skater) (born 1949), Canadian figure skater
 Dave McGillivray, American race director; current director of the Boston Marathon
 Donald McGillivray (botanist), Australian botanical taxonomist
 Donald McGillivray (politician), a politician in British Columbia
 Duncan McGillivray, explorer and fur trader who accompanied David Thompson on explorations of the North-West Territory
 Edward McGillivray, the second mayor of Ottawa from 1858 to 1859
 Florence Helena McGillivray, Canadian painter
 James J. McGillivray, American politician, member of the Wisconsin State Assembly and the Wisconsin State Senate
 John McGillivray (fur trader) (c. 1770 – 1855), Canadian fur trader and political figure in Upper Canada
 John McGillivray (footballer) (1886–??), English footballer 
 John Alexander McGillivray (1853–1911), Canadian lawyer and politician
 Lachlan McGillivray, Scottish-American Indian trader, store keeper, and plantation owner
 Lauchlan McGillivray (died 1880), 19th-century New Zealand politician and Member of Parliament from Southland, New Zealand
 Mal McGillivray (1929–1984), Australian rules footballer 
 Perry McGillivray (1893–1944), American competition swimmer and water polo player, Olympian
 Scott McGillivray (born 1978), Canadian real estate investor, television host, financial expert, contractor, writer, public speaker and educator
 William McGillivray (1764–1825), Scottish-born Canadian fur trader
 William A. McGillivray (1918–1984), Canadian lawyer, jurist, and a Chief Justice of Alberta, Canada

Middle name
 Farquhar McGillivray Knowles (1859–1932), American painter

Anglicised Scottish Gaelic-language surnames